Ramakrishnapur is a census town near Mandamarri mandal in (Mancherial District (Old Adilabad) of the Indian state of Telangana.

References 

Census towns in Telangana